Roman Jahoda (born 24 June 1976 in Brno, Czech Republic) is an Austrian judoka, a professional physical therapist and personal trainer, and the CEO of ComplexCore.

Personal life 
Jahoda was raised in Czechoslovakia for 10 years before moving to Austria. His father, a member of the Czech Judo national team, was an engineer and taught mathematics and sports at university. His mother was a member of the Czech skiing national team and was an architect.

From a very young age, Jahoda participated in hockey (age 4 to 10), swimming (age 6 to 14), and judo (from age 4). He also took part in various one-year experiences, training camps and courses in figure skating, tennis, gymnastics, soccer and sailing.

Sports career 
Roman was most successful in judo and was on the Austrian national judo team for 10 years. He won multiple judo world cups and multiple Austrian Judo Championships and was a contestant at several World and European Judo Championships.

Work career 
From his personal experience and knowledge as a professional athlete, Jahoda was able to successfully become a professional therapist in 2003. He took his expertise one step further by developing the holistic training concept ComplexCore of which he is the CEO. The company offers personalised training programs for both recreational and elite athletes and aims to spread the idea for health and fitness worldwide.

Additionally, as a complement to his company, Roman wrote the book ComplexCore - Core Stabilisation in Training and Therapy. He is a lecturing tutor and invited speaker at various institutions, sport universities and congresses across the world, where he speaks about core training, core mobilisation, core stabilisation, back pain, and other topics.

Jahoda lives in Switzerland and actively supports the Alinghi team with his personal training/therapist services. Since 2008, he is supporting the UEFA International Soccer Referees as a physiotherapist and fitness coach. Since 2010, he is the head coach and physiotherapist of the Austrian Soccer Referees and since 2011 also supports the Swiss Soccer Referees.

For 8 years he supported several drivers from Formula 1 and DTM. He was the personal therapist of Ralf Schumacher for almost 6 years.

He is currently an ambassador for TIQ 2 Sports, an online sports platform for booking and offering sports activities.

Achievements

References
 
Personal homepage of Roman Jahoda
ComplexCore concept at www.complexcore.at
Roman Jahoda Ambassador at TIQ 2 Sports

Austrian male judoka
1976 births
Living people
Association football physiotherapists